Judyth Kitson (born 2 November 1979) is a retired female track and field sprinter from Jamaica, who specialized in the 100 metres. Her personal best time was 11.26 seconds, achieved in May 2003 in Knoxville and also in June 2003 in Kingston, Jamaica.

At the 2003 Pan American Games she finished seventh in the 100 metres, eighth in the 200 metres and won a bronze medal in the 4x100 metre relay. She competed at the 2003 World Championships without reaching the final.

Achievements

References

1979 births
Living people
Jamaican female sprinters
Athletes (track and field) at the 2003 Pan American Games
Pan American Games medalists in athletics (track and field)
Pan American Games bronze medalists for Jamaica
Medalists at the 2003 Pan American Games
21st-century Jamaican women